is a single by Japanese band An Cafe. The single comes in two editions, the limited including a bonus DVD. The song peaked at No. 20 on the Japanese singles chart.

Track listing
Disc one (CD)
"Cherry Saku Yūki!!" (Cherry咲く勇気!!)
"One Way Love"
"Cherry Saku Yūki!! (Instrumental)" (Cherry咲く勇気!! (Instrumental))
"One Way Love (Instrumental)"

Disc two (DVD, Limited edition only)
"Cherry Saku Yūki!!" (Cherry咲く勇気!!)

Personnel
Miku – vocals
Takuya – guitar
Kanon – bass guitar
Yuuki – electronic keyboard
Teruki – drums

References

An Cafe songs
2008 singles
Japanese-language songs
2008 songs
Loop Ash Records singles